The 1988 PBA Reinforced Conference Finals was the best-of-7 series basketball championship of the 1988 PBA Reinforced Conference, and the conclusion of the conference's playoffs. The San Miguel Beermen and Shell Rimula X Diesel Oilers played for the 41st championship contested by the league.

The San Miguel Beermen easily retains the Reinforced Conference title with a 4–1 series victory over Shell Rimula X Diesel Oilers and claim their 5th PBA crown.

Qualification

Series scoring summary

Games summary

Game 1

Shell battled defending champion San Miguel for most of the first three quarters before falling apart in the fourth, enabling the Beermen to win by a rout, the key factor in the opening game was the explosive performance of Franz Pumaren, who came off the bench because of the foul trouble of Hector Calma going into the final quarter.

Game 2

An 11–1 burst by the Beermen in the final two minutes gave them a 2–0 edge in the series, a rash of errors by Shell in the last 1:25 caused their downfall, after battling San Miguel to 11 deadlocks, lose steam in the homestretch and failed to keep their composure by taking a couple of bad shots.

Game 3

Shell raced to an early 17-point lead and with the score at 73–61 in favor of the Diesel Oilers, Jay Ramirez suffered a nasty fall when he pulled down Samboy Lim who landed on top of Ramirez as the rookie banged the back of his head against the hardcourt and had to be carried out on a stretcher. Just when Shell looked sure of a victory, Samboy Lim cut loose to rally the Beermen back and tied the count at 99-all at the end of the third quarter. San Miguel import Michael Phelps fouled out trying to stop Derrick Rowland with Shell on top, 115–111.

Game 4

San Miguel established a big lead early, the third quarter saw Shell mount an uprising that brought them within a couple of baskets of the Beermen until Samboy Lim, who had been fantastic throughout the series, engineered a counter-rally that gave them a dominating 100–85 lead going into the last 12 minutes. Rookie Jay Ramirez was slapped off a deliberate foul on Samboy Lim with some 43 seconds remaining in the game when Samboy apparently got hit on the teeth by Jay's elbow, causing him to bleed in the mouth.

Game 5

Shell took the first two quarters until Samboy Lim once more led his team to a double-digit margin from a 64–70 halftime deficit to a 105–99 San Miguel advantage at the end of the third period. Shell coach Dante Silverio, visibly upset over the poor officiating, was irked when confetti rained down on Shell's frontcourt with 1:11 left to play, the Beermen on top, 145–134. There were only 36 seconds before the final buzzer and the score, 147–138 for San Miguel, when Silverio summoned his players to walk out and immediately leave the playing arena and go back to their locker room, PBA Vice Chairman Jose Ibazeta, who was seated on the San Miguel bench, went to Silverio and tried to convince him to return to the court and apologized for what happened; after some prodding, Silverio acceded to their request of coming back to finish the game, the clock was set back to 1:11 and the count at 145–134 for San Miguel, the Oilers went back with coach Dante Silverio leading the way.

Awards
Sports Columnist Organization of the Philippines (SCOOP) Finals Most Outstanding local player: Samboy Lim ( Average 22.2 pts, 4.4 rebs, 2.8 assists in the finals series)
Sports Columnist Organization of the Philippines (SCOOP) Finals Most Outstanding import: Norman Black

Rosters

Broadcast notes

References

1988
1988 PBA season
San Miguel Beermen games
Shell Turbo Chargers games
PBA Reinforced Conference Finals